Vizefeldwebel Karl Bohnenkamp was a World War I flying ace credited with 15 aerial victories. He scored his first victory on 21 September 1917 and continued through 28 October 1918. His 15 victories made him the leading ace in his squadron. He was awarded the Military Merit Cross on the latter date.

Military career

Before Bohnenkamp qualified as a pilot, he was a radio operator for Feldflieger Abteilung (Field Flier Detachment) 39 from May 1915 to August 1916. After undergoing pilot's training, he was assigned to Feldflieger Abteilung 208 in February 1917. On 25 July 1917, he was "promoted" to flying fighter aircraft for Royal Saxon Jagdstaffel 22. His first aerial success came on 21 September 1917. He would continue to score victories almost until war's end, his last one coming on 28 October 1918. The latter date, he was presented with the Golden Military Merit Cross–the highest military decoration that could be awarded to a German noncommissioned officer.

Sources of information

References
 Franks, Norman; Bailey, Frank W.; Guest, Russell. Above the Lines: The Aces and Fighter Units of the German Air Service, Naval Air Service and Flanders Marine Corps, 1914–1918. Grub Street, 1993. , .

Further reading

External links
 Frontflieger.de

1890 births
1930 deaths
German World War I flying aces
Luftstreitkräfte personnel
Military personnel from Dortmund
People from the Rhine Province
Prussian Army personnel